Kolossus is Keep of Kalessin's fourth studio album. It was released on June 6, 2008, in Europe and on June 10 in the U.S. A limited edition deluxe digipak was released under Indie Recordings which contains a bonus DVD including interviews, behind-the-scenes material, the making of Kolossus, the live performance Come Damnation, Live in Paris 2006 and the Kolossus teaser.

Track listing

Notes
  A music video for the song Ascendant was made.

Personnel
 Arnt "Obsidian C." Ove Grønbech - guitars, synthesizers
 Torbjørn "Thebon" Schei - lead vocals
 Robin "Wizziac" Isaksen - bass
 Vegar "Vyl" Larsen - drums
 Håkon-Marius Pettersen - piano, keyboards
 Daniel Elide - percussion

Charts

References

2008 albums
Keep of Kalessin albums
Nuclear Blast albums
Indie Recordings albums